The Minister of Housing and Community Development was a cabinet minister position in the province of Manitoba, Canada. The position was created in 2009 following the separation of the Family Services and Housing portfolio. The responsibilities were transferred to the Minister of Families on May 3, 2016.

List of Ministers of Housing and Community Development

References

Housing and Community Development, Minister of